Starka is a type of distilled alcoholic beverage made from fermented rye mash. Traditionally Starka is made from natural (up to 2 distillations, no rectification) rye spirit and aged in oak barrels with small additions of linden-tree and apple-tree leaves. The methods of production are similar to those used in making rye whisky. Sold in various grades, the most notable difference between them is the length of the aging period, varying from 3 to over 50 years, and the natural colour which is obtained from the reaction between the alcohol and the oak barrel, not from the additives.

History 
Starka was known in Poland and Lithuania at least since the 15th century, later in the Polish–Lithuanian Commonwealth, and by the 17th century became one of the favourite drinks of the nobility of the Commonwealth and Sarmatist culture. Tradition had it that at a child's birth, the father of the house poured large amounts of home-made spirits (approximately 75 proof) into an empty oak barrel, previously used to store wine (usually imported from Hungary at that time and hence called Węgrzyn, or Hungarian). The barrel was then sealed with beeswax and buried, only to be dug out at the child's wedding. The name itself stems from this process of aging and in 15th century Polish meant both the vodka type and an old woman. Alternatively the name is derived from the Lithuanian word "Starkus", as production of Starka is associated with birth.

In late 19th century various companies (mostly in Imperial Russia and Austria-Hungary) slightly simplified the production process and adopted it to the needs of mass production by the Lwów-based Baczewski company. After the end of World War I, which put an end to foreign rule over former parts of the Polish–Lithuanian Commonwealth, starka remained one of the most popular spirits in both countries. After World War II when Lithuania was inside the Soviet Union, starka production there was not stopped and was produced in "Vilniaus degtinė" and "Stumbras" (Kaunas) factories. In Poland, all of the spirit producers were nationalized, but the production of starka continued, mostly as a high-priced export good.

Currently, Szczecińska Fabryka Wódek "Starka" (former Polmos Szczecin) is the only company to produce Starka in Poland, and they offer it in all age classes, from 3 to 50 years old but the oldest Starkas date back to 1947. All Starkas produced by Szczecińska Fabryka Wódek "Starka" contain 40% - 50% alcohol by volume. There is also a number of other companies (most notably in Lithuania, Bulgaria, Kazakhstan, Russia, Latvia and United States) that produce vodkas styled after the starka (produced mostly from a mixture of rectified spirit and herbal tinctures).

References

External links
Starka, one of the most respected manufacturers of Starka
Stumbras, producer of Starka-styled alcohol from Lithuania
Vilniaus Degtine , producer of Starka-styled alcohol from Lithuania
St. Louis Distillery, producer of Starka in USA
Duvall Distillery, Producer of American Starka (not quite old enough for marriage) Duvall Washington USA

Polish vodkas
Lithuanian vodkas